Cosas de Amigos is the fourth album by Mexican pop singer Verónica Castro. It was released in 1981. In this album, Castro has a duet with her then 6-year-old son, Cristian Castro

Track listing

  "Mi Cumpleaños Contigo"   (Rossana Rosa)
  "Yofo Tefe"     (Tirzo Páiz)
  "Juntos Por Amor"   (Denisse De Kalafe) 
  "Vamos A Salir Los Dos"   (Denisse De Kalafe, Lolita De La Colina)
  "No Es No"      (Rossana Rosa)
  "El Talismán"  (E. Rodríguez Asdraja) 
  "Juntos Vamos a Volar"  (Manolo Marroquí)   with her then 6-year-old son Cristian Castro
  "Tu No Sabes Amar"  (E. Pound/ Lalo)
  "Usted Y Yo"   (Gabriel Ruíz)
  "Rodando, Rodando" /Crying In The Pain  (B. Drummond, Lalo)

Singles

1981 albums
Verónica Castro albums